This article contains information about the literary events and publications of 1779.

Events
April 6 – The premiėre of Iphigenie auf Tauris by Johann Wolfgang Goethe is held at the private Ducal Palace in Weimar.
October 8 – William Blake enrols as a student with the Royal Academy of Arts at Somerset House in London.

New books

Fiction
Richard Graves – Columella
Friedrich Heinrich Jacobi – Woldemar
Ignacy Krasicki – Fables and Parables (Bajki i przypowieści)
Nocturnal Revels
Samuel Jackson Pratt as "Courtney Melmoth"
Shenstone-Green
The Tutor of Truth
The Sorrows of Werther (anonymous translation of a Johann Wolfgang von Goethe work)

Children
Joachim Heinrich Campe – Robinson der Jüngere (based on Defoe)

Drama
Fanny Burney – The Witlings (unpublished)
Hannah Cowley
Albina, Countess Raimond
Who's the Dupe
Richard Cumberland – Calypso
Hugh Downman – Lucius Junius Brutus
Jean-Pierre Claris de Florian – Les Deux Billets
William Hodson – Zoraida
Robert Jephson – The Law of Lombardy
Gotthold Ephraim Lessing – Nathan der Weise (published)
Richard Brinsley Sheridan – The Critic

Poetry

William Cowper and John Newton – Olney Hymns
Robert Fergusson – Poems
William Hayley – Epistle to Admiral Keppel
Ann Murry – Poems
Gaspar Melchor de Jovellanos – Epístola de Jovino a Anfriso, escrita desde el Paular
Leandro Fernandez de Moratín – La toma de Granada por los Reyes Católicos don Fernando y doña Isabel
Tomás de Iriarte – La música

Non-fiction
John Abercrombie – The British Fruit Gardener and Art of Pruning
Anna Barbauld – Lessons for Children
James Burnett – Antient Metaphysics
Edward Capell – Notes and Various Readings to Shakespeare
George Chalmers – Political Annals of the Present United Colonies
Edward Gibbon – A Vindication of Some Passages in the History of the Decline and Fall of the Roman Empire
David Hume (died 1776; anonymously) – Dialogues Concerning Natural Religion
Samuel Johnson – Prefaces, Biographical and Critical, to the Works of the English Poets
Vicessimus Knox – Essays
Franz Mesmer – Mémoire sur la découverte du magnétisme animal
John Moore – A View of Society and Manners in France, Switzerland, and Germany
Thomas Scott – The Force of Truth
Horace Walpole – A Letter to the Editor of the Miscellanies of Thomas Chatterton

Births
January 18 – Peter Mark Roget, English lexicographer (died 1869)
March 1 – Gottfried Weber, German writer on music (died 1839)
March 3 – Matthäus Casimir von Collin, Austrian poet and dramatist (died 1824)
March 10 – Frances Trollope (born Frances Milton), English novelist and writer (died 1863)
March 30 – Antoine Ó Raifteiri, Irish Gaelic poet (died 1835)
May 2 – John Galt, Scottish novelist and entrepreneur (died 1839)
May 28 – Thomas Moore, Irish poet and songwriter (died 1852)
August 1 – Francis Scott Key, American poet (died 1843)
September 10 – Alexander Voeykov, Russian poet (died 1839)
November 14 – Adam Oehlenschläger, Danish Romantic poet and dramatist (died 1850)
December 22 – Thomas Gaisford, English classicist (died 1855)
December 31 – Horace (Horatio) Smith, English poet and novelist (died 1849)

Deaths
January 20 – David Garrick, English dramatist, actor and impresario (born 1717)
March 4 – Heinrich Leopold Wagner, German dramatist (born 1747)
June 7  – William Warburton, English writer, critic and cleric (born 1698)
June 10 – William Kenrick, English novelist, playwright and satirist (born c. 1725)
July 10 – Jane Gomeldon, English essayist and writer of maxims (born c. 1720)
July 21 – Caleb Fleming, English minister and pamphleteer (born 1698)
November 16 – Pehr Kalm, Swedish/Finnish botanist, naturalist and travel writer (born 1716)
December 22 – István Küzmics (Števan Küzmič), Hungarian writer in Prekmurje Slovene (Wendish) (born c. 1723)

References

 
Years of the 18th century in literature